Mickey's Disguises is a 1933 short film in Larry Darmour's Mickey McGuire series starring a young Mickey Rooney. Directed by Jesse Duffy, the two-reel short was released to theaters on July 17, 1933 by RKO Radio Pictures.

Synopsis
After being accused of stealing chickens, Hambone's Uncle Nemo gets arrested. Mickey, Hambone, and the Gang believe that Nemo is innocent, and form a detective agency in order to catch the real thief. The kids suspect Mayor Davis' chauffeur; it's up to Billy (in a chicken costume) to catch the real crook.

Cast
Mickey Rooney - Mickey McGuire
Billy Barty - Billy McGuire
Jimmy Robinson - Hambone Johnson
Marvin Stephens - Katrink
Delia Bogard - Tomboy Taylor
Douglas Fox - Stinkie Davis
Spencer Bell - The chauffeur

Notes
The short marked the final appearances of Delia Bogard and Douglas Fox in the series. Following this film, Shirley Jean Rickert would replace Bogard in the role of 'Tomboy Taylor', and Douglas Scott would replace Fox in the role of 'Stinkie Davis'.

External links 
 

1933 films
1933 comedy films
American black-and-white films
Mickey McGuire short film series
1933 short films
American comedy short films
1930s English-language films
1930s American films